Spicerhaart Group Ltd is an English estate agency and financial services company based in Colchester, Essex, and operating throughout the United Kingdom. It is the largest independent estate agency network in the UK.

History
The company has its origins in 1989, where father and son Alick and Paul Smith opened three branches of Spicer McColl in East Anglia. They took over 45 Darlows branches in 2000 when that company went into receivership, and acquired the South Yorkshire company Haybrook in 2007.

Spicerhaart purchased iSold estate agents (formerly Tesco Property Market) from Tesco plc in 2008, after it was ruled that Tesco could not act as an estate agent without being registered as such. Spicerhaart and Tesco are now involved in a legal dispute.

Spicerhaart came under criticism during the COVID-19 outbreak by terminating hundreds of staff the day prior to the furlough scheme.

Management
Paul Smith is CEO and John Spence OBE is the Non-Executive Chairman. The company's headquarters and contact centre are in Colchester, Essex.

Estate agency brands 
Spicerhaart currently trade under the following brands:
Brian Holt (Coventry)
Butters John Bee (Staffordshire, Cheshire & Shropshire)
Chewton Rose (South England and Midlands)
Darlows (Cardiff and Wales)
Felicity J Lord (London area)
Haart (across England)
Haybrook (South Yorkshire)
Howards (Norfolk)
Just Mortgages
Spicerhaart Financial Services
Spicerhaart Land and New Homes
Valunation

Notes

Real estate companies established in 1989
Financial services companies established in 1989
Companies based in Colchester
Property services companies of the United Kingdom